Almeda Lake is a lake in the U.S. state of Montana.

Almeda Lake is named after the wife of Thomas Shields (who himself is the namesake to Shields Creek).

See also
List of lakes in Flathead County, Montana (A-L)

References

Lakes of Flathead County, Montana